La mazurka del barone, della santa e del fico fiorone is a 1975 Italian black comedy film co-written and directed by Pupi Avati. It is considered one of the most atypical commedia all'italiana films.

The film marked Avati's return to filmmaking after a six-year absence, during which he worked as director of TV commercials.

Cast

See also 
 List of Italian films of 1975

References

External links

1975 films
1970s black comedy films
Commedia all'italiana
Films about dysfunctional families
Films about prostitution in Italy
Films directed by Pupi Avati
Films set in Emilia-Romagna
Films with atheism-related themes
Italian black comedy films
Religious satire films
1970s Italian-language films
1970s Italian films